Walter Meierjohann is a theatre director working in Britain. He is artistic director, theatre, of HOME, the centre for international contemporary arts, theatre and film formed by the merger of Cornerhouse and the Library Theatre Company.

Career 
In 2002, Meierjohann was asked by Peter Stein to direct Thornton Wilder’s A Long Christmas Dinner with Stein’s Ensemble in Berlin, and in the same year, he was nominated for a festival award for his production of The Just by Albert Camus. In 2004 Meierjohann joined the State Theatre of Dresden as founder and Artistic Director of NEUBAU: an international New Writing theatre. Other productions in Germany include: Waiting for Godot, Long Day’s Journey into Night, Death of a Salesman, and Mary Stuart.

Meierjohann joined the Young Vic in 2007 as International Associate Director. His productions there include: the European premiere of In the Red and Brown Water by Tarell McCraney, and Kafka’s Monkey, a new adaptation of Franz Kafka’s Report to an Academy, starring award- winning actress Kathryn Hunter and adapted by Colin Teevan.

Other recent UK productions include: Unleashed at The Barbican, The Resistible Rise of Arturo Ui at the Nottingham Playhouse, and All My Sons at The Curve.

References

External links 
 HOME Manchester

British theatre directors
Year of birth missing (living people)
Living people
Place of birth missing (living people)